Anhedonia is an inability to experience pleasurable emotions from normally pleasurable life events.

Anhedonia may also refer to:
Anhedonia (Burning Brides album)
Anhedonia (The Graduate album)
Anhedonia, the working title for the 1977 film Annie Hall